Alestopetersius is a genus of characins, fish found mostly in Congo River Basin in Middle Africa with one species (A. smykalai) from the lower Niger River in Nigeria.  There are currently 10 described species in this genus.

Species
 Alestopetersius bifasciatus (Poll, 1967)
 Alestopetersius brichardi Poll, 1967
 Alestopetersius caudalis (Boulenger, 1899) (Yellowtail tetra)
 Alestopetersius compressus (Poll & J. P. Gosse, 1963)
 Alestopetersius conspectus Mbimbe & Stiassny, 2012
 Alestopetersius hilgendorfi (Boulenger, 1899)
 Alestopetersius leopoldianus (Boulenger, 1899)
 Alestopetersius nigropterus Poll, 1967
 Alestopetersius smykalai Poll, 1967
 Alestopetersius tumbensis Hoedeman, 1951

References
 

Alestidae
Fish of Africa
Taxa named by Jacobus Johannes Hoedeman